Sahaidachnyi is a Ukrainian surname. It may refer to:

 Petro Konashevych-Sahaidachny (c. 1582–1622), Ukrainian political, civic, and military leader
  Ukrainian frigate Hetman Sahaydachniy, a frigate of the Ukrainian Navy
 Hetman Petro Sahaidachnyi National Ground Forces Academy in Lviv, Ukraine 
 Hetman Sahaidachny, a racing yacht